John Scott (born 2 January 1942) is an English former professional footballer who played as an inside forward.

Career
Born in Normanton, Scott played for Bradford City, Chesterfield and Matlock Town.

References

1942 births
Living people
English footballers
Bradford City A.F.C. players
Chesterfield F.C. players
Matlock Town F.C. players
English Football League players
Association football inside forwards
People from Normanton, West Yorkshire